Bolpur Assembly constituency is an assembly constituency in Birbhum district in the Indian state of West Bengal.

Overview
As per orders of the Delimitation Commission, No. 286, Bolpur Assembly constituency is composed of the following: Bolpur municipality, Ilambazar CD Block and Raipur Supur, Ruppur and Sattor gram panchayats of Bolpur Sriniketan CD Block.

Bolpur Assembly constituency is part of No. 41 Bolpur (Lok Sabha constituency) (SC).

Election results

2021

In the 2021 elections, Chandranath Sinha of Trinamool Congress defeated his nearest rival, Dr. Anirban Ganguly of BJP.

2016

In the 2016 elections, Chandranath Sinha of Trinamool Congress defeated his nearest rival, Tapan Hore of RSP.

2011
In the 2011 elections, Chandranath Singha of Trinamool Congress defeated Tapan Hore of RSP.

 

.# Swing calculated on Congress+Trinamool Congress vote percentages taken together in 2006.

1977-2006
In the 2006, 2001, 1996 and 1991 state assembly elections Tapan Hore of RSP won the Bolpur assembly seat defeating his nearest rivals Chittaranjan Rakshit of Trinamool Congress  in 2006, Dr. Sushobhan Banerjee of Trinamool Congress in 2001, Shibshankar Banerjee of Congress in 1996 and Dr. Sushobhan Banerjee of Congress in 1991. Tarapada Ghosh of RSP defeated Dr. Sushobhan Banerjee of Congress in 1987. Contests in most years were multi cornered but only winners and runners are being mentioned. In a by-election necessitated by the death of sitting MLA Jyotsna Kumar Gupta, Dr. Sushovan Banerjee of Congress won the seat in 1984. Jyotsna Kumar Gupta of RSP defeated Dr. Sushobhan Banerjee of Congress in 1982 and Gourhari Chandra of Congress in 1977.

1951–1972
Harashankar Bhattacharya of CPI won in 1971. Prasanta Mukherjee of CPI(M) won in 1971. Panna Lal Dasgupta, Independent, won in 1969. R.K. Sinha, Independent, won in 1967. Radha Krishna Singha of RSP won in 1962. Amarendra Nath Sarkar of Congress won in 1957. Hanseswar Roy and Bhusan Hansdah, both of Congress, jointly won the Bolpur seat in 1951.

References

Assembly constituencies of West Bengal
Politics of Birbhum district